Moulton Junction was a railroad junction in Appanoose County, Iowa where two railroads, Norfolk Southern Railway and the Chicago, Rock Island and Pacific Railroad (Rock Island), formerly met.

References

Railway stations in Iowa
Transportation buildings and structures in Appanoose County, Iowa